Kuzma-Alexandrovka is a rural locality (a village) in Tabynsky Selsoviet, Gafuriysky District, Bashkortostan, Russia. The population was 1 as of 2010. There is 1 street.

Geography 
Kuzma-Alexandrovka is located 13 km northwest of Krasnousolsky (the district's administrative centre) by road. Tabynskoye is the nearest rural locality.

References 

Rural localities in Gafuriysky District